Parel – Prabhadevi railway station is a Railway station junction which connects the Central line and Western line of Mumbai Suburban Railway. It serves the area of Parel and Prabhadevi in Mumbai, India.

This railway station has seven platforms, of which two are on the Prabhadevi side and the remaining platforms are on the Parel side with the middle one is a terminal platform and two platforms on the far east is for fast trains line, both sides are of only slow trains halt.

Passengers
Parel and Prabhadevi railway stations are a set of one of the busiest stations on the Mumbai Suburban Railway network. Over 15.6 million passenger's journey originates from either of these stations, earning  yearly, due to offices being situated around these railway stations.

History

Parel side
The railway station on the Parel side was opened to the public in 1877 for direct connectivity from Parel to other stations on the Central Railway network.

On 4 March 2019, the terminal platform on the slow line of the Parel side was inaugurated by Piyush Goyal (Minister of Railways) for reducing the higher passenger pressure load at Dadar railway station. Which it was demanded for many years by the people for easier access on the Central side.

Prabhadevi side
The railway station on the Prabhadevi side was inaugurated in 1867 which was named Elphinstone Road railway station (with station code EPR) after the Lord Elphinstone, which was the Governor of Bombay from 1853 to 1860.

After the Independence, the local people demanded the railway station rename to Prabhadevi. This renaming was first proposed by Shiv Sena leader Diwakar Raote in 1991. Which comes from the Hindu goddess Prabhavati Devi. A 12th-century idol of the goddess is installed inside an 18th-century Prabhadevi Temple locates near the station. For that purpose, the Maharashtra Assembly passed the resolution on 16 December 2016. After that, Maharashtra Government sent a proposal for renaming the station to Union Home Ministry which it was approved on 6 May 2017.

After the approval, the name of Elphinstone Road railway station was officially changed to Prabhadevi railway station on 19 July 2018. with its new station code as PBHD with the approval of Indian Railways

Foot-over-bridges
Due to the super-dense crush load on this station, two foot overbridges are constructed between the southern part of the Parel side and the northern part of the Prabhadevi side for easier interchanging between these platforms. Both of them were constructed in 2018.

Before that, there was only one foot overbridge that was narrower in width and older than 50 years, This created problems for commuters during peak hours. Due to this, commuters used to cross the tracks on to the adjoining platform 3 and use the FOB of that platform. This prompted the Railways to put up a fence between the platforms in order to stop commuters from crossing the tracks. This has increased the pressure on the overbridge even more and hence forced the Railways into assigning the Railway Protection Force and Home Guard to help commuters cross the bridge and prevent any stampedes and also help to approach trains.

For that purpose, the first foot overbridge was reconstructed by the joint operation of the Corps of Engineers of the Indian Army and Indian Railways and opened on 27 February 2018, within the time span of 117 days. Whereas the second foot overbridge was newly constructed to reduce the load on the first foot overbridge and make a second interchange on this station, Opened for the public on 18 June 2018.

Stampede

On 29 September 2017 during the morning rush-hour, a stampede occurred at the western side of foot overbridge on the Parel–Prabhadevi railway station. 23 people were killed, 19 injured and 39 suffered other injuries. The incident was classified as a case of an accident by the Mumbai Police.

References

Railway stations opened in 1867
1867 establishments in India
Mumbai WR railway division
Railway stations in Mumbai City district
Mumbai Suburban Railway stations
Mumbai CR railway division